Riya Sharma is an Indian actress who mainly works in Hindi television. She made her acting debut in 2018 with Saat Phero Ki Hera Pherie portraying Chinki Tandon. She is best known for her portrayal of Dr. Mayura Dubey Shukla in Pinjara Khubsurti Ka, Kashibai Ballal in Kashibai Bajirao Ballal and Princess Tarapriya in Dhruv Tara - Samay Sadi Se Pare

Career
Sharma made her acting debut in 2018 with Saat Phero Ki Hera Pherie portraying Chinki Tandon. 

In 2020, she portrayed Sunaina in Maharaj Ki Jai Ho! opposite Satyajeet Dubey. It ended in two months due to COVID-19 pandemic.

From 2020 to 2021, she portrayed Dr. Mayura Dubey Shukla in Pinjara Khubsurti Ka opposite Sahil Uppal. She portrayed Mayura Goswami Vashisht in 2021, after the reincarnation track. It proved as a major turning point in her career.

Sharma started portraying Kashibai Ballal opposite Rohit Chandel in Kashibai Bajirao Ballal from March 2022. The show ended in August 2022.

Since October 2022, she is seen portraying Dr. Tulika in Banni Chow Home Delivery.

Since February 2023, Sharma is seen portraying Rajkumari Tarapriya Singh in Dhruv Tara – Samay Sadi Se Pare opposite Ishaan Dhawan.

Sharma will make her film debut with Disha Jha's Konman opposite Adhyayan Suman.

Filmography

Films

Television

See also
 List of Hindi television actresses

References

External links

Indian television actresses
Year of birth missing (living people)
Living people
Actresses in Hindi television
21st-century Indian actresses